Herlea is a Romanian surname. Notable people with the surname include:
 Nicolae Herlea (1927–2014), Romanian operatic baritone
  (born 1942), Romanian historian, politician, professor, and ambassador

See also
 Herle (surname)

Romanian-language surnames